Miguel Zambrano (born 21 September 1951) is a Peruvian former wrestler who competed in the 1972 Summer Olympics and in the 1980 Summer Olympics.

References

External links
 

1951 births
Living people
Olympic wrestlers of Peru
Wrestlers at the 1972 Summer Olympics
Wrestlers at the 1980 Summer Olympics
Peruvian male sport wrestlers
Pan American Games bronze medalists for Peru
Pan American Games medalists in wrestling
Wrestlers at the 1971 Pan American Games
Wrestlers at the 1979 Pan American Games
Wrestlers at the 1987 Pan American Games
Medalists at the 1971 Pan American Games
Medalists at the 1979 Pan American Games
20th-century Peruvian people
21st-century Peruvian people